La ragazza dalla pelle di luna (also known as Sex of Their Bodies, Moon Skin and The Sinner) is a 1973 Italian erotic drama film written and directed by Luigi Scattini. It marked the film debut of Zeudi Araya.

Plot 
Alberto, an engineer, and Helen, a magazine photographer, have been married for a few years, but their marriage is in crisis. Then they decide to take a trip to Seychelles, where they will betray one another.

Cast 
Zeudi Araya as Simoa
Ugo Pagliai as Alberto
Beba Lončar as Helen
Giacomo Rossi Stuart as Giacomo

See also   
 List of Italian films of 1973

References

External links

1970s Italian-language films
1970s erotic drama films
Italian erotic drama films
Films directed by Luigi Scattini
Films scored by Piero Umiliani
Films set in Seychelles
Adultery in films
1973 drama films
1973 films
1970s Italian films